Ney Raúl Augusto Avilés Aguirre (born February 17, 1964) is a retired Ecuadorian football striker. He played 55 times for the Ecuador national team, in the forward and center forward position, scoring 16 goals between 1987 and 1993. 

He attended the Vicente Rocafuerte school where he was part of the students sports league.

Avilés started his career in 1985 with 9 de Octubre, he soon joined Club Sport Emelec where he was part of the championship winning team of 1988.

He joined rivals Barcelona Sporting Club in 1993, but missed out on their 1995 championship success as he spent that season with Liga de Portoviejo.  He returned to Barcelona and in 1997 won his 2nd league championship he remained with the club until 2000.

He spent his last year playing for Santa Rita Vinces in the Ecuadorian 2nd division.

At international level Avilés, he is the seventh highest scoring player in the history of the Ecuador national team. He participated in four editions of the Copa América in 1987, 1989, 1991 and 1993

Honors

Club
 Emelec
 Serie A de Ecuador: 1988
 Barcelona
 Serie A de Ecuador: 1997

References

External links
 

1964 births
Living people
Sportspeople from Guayaquil
Ecuadorian footballers
Association football forwards
Barcelona S.C. footballers
C.S. Emelec footballers
Sporting Cristal footballers
L.D.U. Portoviejo footballers
Ecuador international footballers
1987 Copa América players
1989 Copa América players
1991 Copa América players
1993 Copa América players
Ecuadorian expatriate footballers
Expatriate footballers in Peru